Craig Murray (born 16 July 1994) is a Scottish professional footballer, who plays for Rutherglen Glencairn. Murray, a midfielder, previously played for East Fife, Aberdeen, Ayr United, and Cumbernauld Colts.

Career
Murray first joined Aberdeen at the age of 10. He made his debut for Aberdeen against St Johnstone on 22 December 2012, coming on as a late substitute.

On 14 January 2015, Murray signed for Ayr United on loan until the end of the 2014–15 season. After returning from his loan spell, Murray was released by Aberdeen.

On 10 July 2015, Murray signed for East Fife. In August 2016, Murray joined Cumbernauld Colts.

Rutherglen Glencairn announced the signing of Murray on 9 March 2022.

Career statistics

References

External links

1994 births
Living people
Scottish footballers
Aberdeen F.C. players
Ayr United F.C. players
East Fife F.C. players
Scottish Premier League players
Scottish Professional Football League players
Association football midfielders
Cumbernauld Colts F.C. players
Lowland Football League players
Rutherglen Glencairn F.C. players